The Sport Review (thesportreview.com) is a sport news website founded in 2008 and based in London.

The site primarily covers the most popular sports in the United Kingdom, including football, tennis, rugby union, cricket and Formula 1.

It was created in November 2008 and was founded by two journalists, Martin Caparrotta and Kieran Beckles.

Regular features on the site include 'The Grapevine' - an interactive football transfer gossip column, and 'Short and Tweet' - a round-up of Twitter updates from sports stars and celebrities following headline sporting events.

The site, which has a readership of around two million unique users a month, won the 2010 Bright Ideas Award at University College London.

References

External links 
 Official website
 The Sport Review on Twitter
 The Sport Review on Facebook
 The Sport Review on Google+

Sports mass media in the United Kingdom